Lamokin Street is a former regional rail station on the SEPTA Regional Rail Wilmington/Newark Line located at Lamokin Street in Chester, Pennsylvania. Until 1972, it was the junction for the Chester Creek Branch, controlled by nearby Lamokin Tower. The branch line was operated by the Pennsylvania Railroad and later Penn Central, until service ended in 1972 due to damage caused by Hurricane Agnes.

The station was classified as a flag stop, which required passengers to tell the train crew that they wanted to board or depart prior to arrival. It was closed on July 1, 2003 due to low ridership - just 36 passengers per day. The former site is adjacent to an electrical substation that provides power to both Amtrak's Northeast Corridor and SEPTA's Media/Wawa lines. Highland Avenue and Chester Transportation Center stations nearby are still served by SEPTA.

References

External links
Former Lamokin Station shelter image

Former SEPTA Regional Rail stations
Former railway stations in Delaware County, Pennsylvania
Stations on the Northeast Corridor
Chester, Pennsylvania
Former Pennsylvania Railroad stations

Railway stations closed in 2003
Wilmington/Newark Line